Michael Henry Anthony (8 August 1894 – 3 May 1966) was an Australian rules footballer who played with Melbourne and St Kilda in the Victorian Football League (VFL).

He enlisted for service in World War I in 1915, but was discharged on medical grounds after completing two months of training at Seymour.

Notes

External links 

 

1894 births
1966 deaths
Australian rules footballers from South Australia
Melbourne Football Club players
St Kilda Football Club players
Port Adelaide Football Club (SANFL) players
Australian military personnel of World War I